Michael Joseph Murphy (1 July 1915 – 3 April 2007) was an American prelate of the Catholic Church. He served as Bishop of Erie, Pennsylvania, from 1982 to 1990.

Early life and education
Michael Murphy was born in Cleveland, Ohio, the only child of William and Mary Bridget (née Patton) Murphy. His father was a first-generation Irish American whereas his mother hailed directly from Ireland, where her parents lived on Achill Island, County Mayo. He attended St. Rose and St. James Grade Schools, and graduated from Cathedral Latin High School in 1933. After attending Niagara University for two years, he began his studies for the priesthood at St. Mary's Seminary in Cleveland in 1935. Murphy once recalled, "I can't think of ever having had another vocational aspiration than the priesthood. And from the earliest years of grade school, my mother used to recall that as a youngster I would, coming back from church, offer a Mass of my own using a bath towel or something as a chasuble and that sort of routine."

He was later sent to further his studies in Rome at the Pontifical North American College and Pontifical Gregorian University, from where he obtained a Bachelor of Arts degree in Philosophy. His studies were interrupted in 1940 by the outbreak of World War II, leading him to return to the United States and enter the Theological College of the Catholic University of America in Washington, D.C. He there earned a Licentiate of Sacred Theology in 1942.

Priesthood
On 28 February 1942, Murphy was ordained a priest for the Diocese of Cleveland by Bishop James McFadden at the Cathedral of St. John the Evangelist. Following his ordination, he returned to the Catholic University of America to complete his graduate studies. He was appointed to the faculty of St. Mary's Seminary as professor of moral and pastoral theology in 1943, becoming dean of students in 1944 and vice-rector in 1948. He served as rector of St. Mary's from 1963 to 1976.

Episcopal ministry

Auxiliary Bishop of Cleveland
On 20 April 1976, Murphy was appointed Auxiliary Bishop of Cleveland and Titular Bishop of Arindela by Pope Paul VI. He received his episcopal consecration on the following 11 June from Bishop James Hickey, with Archbishop Joseph Bernardin and Bishop Clarence Issenmann serving as co-consecrators. He selected as his episcopal motto: "Peace and Compassion". As an auxiliary bishop, he served as episcopal vicar for Summit County with residence in Akron.

Coadjutor Bishop of Erie
Murphy was named Coadjutor Bishop of Erie, Pennsylvania, on 20 November 1978; he was only the third U.S. appointment of the newly elected Pope John Paul II. He was formally installed as Bishop Alfred Watson's coadjutor, or designated successor, on the following 27 December. Murphy soon visited every parish in the diocese and reorganized the diocesan administration to improve pastoral service to Catholics, delegating some of the bishop's authority and allowing more participation of religious and laity.

His 1980 pastoral letter on marriage served as the basis for the diocesan policy on marriage preparation. Murphy was called to the Vatican that same year for a series of meetings with John Paul II to discuss American Catholic seminaries, having spent most of his priesthood as teacher and rector at St. Mary's Seminary. Besides regrouping diocesan offices, he created four vicariates in 1981.

Bishop of Erie
Upon Bishop Watson's retirement, Murphy succeeded him as the eighth Bishop of Erie on 16 July 1982. He founded the Emmaus Program, an annual convocation of diocesan clergy for their continuing education and spiritual formation, in 1983. In 1984, he announced a three-year plan to raise $9 million to cover diocesan expenses, including educational and social needs and the renovation of St. Peter Cathedral; the appeal raised over $14 million in pledges. In 1985, he launched a spiritual growth process called RENEW, which attracted the participation of more than 20,000 people throughout the diocese and lasted until 1988.

A promoter of the consistent life ethic, Murphy opposed both abortion and the death penalty. He wrote an open letter to Pennsylvania Governor (and future U.S. Attorney General) Dick Thornburgh in 1986 voicing his opposition to the death penalty, saying, "We are disappointed, frightened, angered even to the point of vengeance when the lives of others become so warped and twisted that they have become destructive of life itself. We wonder why the gift of life was given to them. But the gift is not ours. Neither is it ours to say, 'They do not deserve to live!'" In a 1989 Christmas message, he declared, "As a means to the peace which He promises us and indeed has made possible for us, may the Prince of Peace gift all of us and our nation with a real awareness of the sacredness of all human life, unborn no less than born." He established St. Mark Catholic Center and the Diocesan Committee on Human Sexuality in 1987 and, upon the advice of pastors, principals and parish leaders, he merged several parishes and closed one school in 1989.

Handling of Sex Abuse
In a grand jury report released by Pennsylvania Attorney General Josh Shapiro, Murphy was criticized allowing "predator priest" Chester Gawronski to remain in the Erie Diocese after he received reports that Gawronski was sexually abusing children. Both Murphy and his successor Donald Trautman often reassigned Gawronski to different parishes between 1987 and 2002.  An allegation of sexual abuse against Erie priest William Presley, who was transferred to the Harrisburg Diocese in 1986, had also been reported to the Diocese by his male accuser in 1982, 1987, and 2002.

Later life and death
Approaching the mandatory retirement age of 75, Murphy resigned as Bishop on 2 June 1990, after an eight-year-long tenure. He spent his 16 years of retirement at St. Patrick Parish in Erie. He later died at the infirmary of the Sisters of Mercy Motherhouse in Erie, aged 91.

References

|-

1915 births
2007 deaths
Religious leaders from Cleveland
Niagara University alumni
Saint Mary Seminary and Graduate School of Theology alumni
Roman Catholic Diocese of Cleveland
American people of Irish descent
Roman Catholic bishops of Erie
Catholic University of America alumni
20th-century Roman Catholic bishops in the United States